Stukovo is a rural locality (a selo) and the administrative center of Stukovsky Selsoviet, Pavlovsky District, Altai Krai, Russia. The population was 1,222 as of 2013. There are 8 streets.

Geography 
Stukovo is located 35 km southeast of Pavlovsk (the district's administrative centre) by road. Sarai is the nearest rural locality.

References 

Rural localities in Pavlovsky District, Altai Krai